Invasion 1700 (also known as With Fire and Sword and Daggers of Blood) is a 1962 Italian-French historical epic film directed by Fernando Cerchio. It is based on the 1884 Polish historical novel With Fire and Sword written by Henryk Sienkiewicz.

Cast 

Jeanne Crain as  Helena Kurcewiczówna
Pierre Brice as Jan Skrzetuski
Elena Zareschi as  Princess Kurcewicz
John Drew Barrymore as Bohun
Gordon Mitchell as  Ulrich 
Akim Tamiroff as  Jan Onufry Zagłoba
Raoul Grassilli as  Wasyl Kurcewicz
Bruno Nessi as  Longinus Podbipięta
Eleonora Vargas as  Horpyna
Nerio Bernardi as prince Jeremi Wiśniowiecki
Nando Angelini as Symeon Kurcewicz, a Polish nobleman
Alberto Stefanini as Andrzej Kurcewicz, a Polish nobleman.
Milena Vukotic

See also
With Fire and Sword (1999)

References

External links

1962 films
1962 adventure films
1962 drama films
Italian adventure drama films
French adventure drama films
Italian historical adventure films
French historical adventure films
1960s Italian-language films
English-language French films
English-language Italian films
1960s English-language films
Films directed by Fernando Cerchio
Films based on works by Henryk Sienkiewicz
Films scored by Francesco De Masi
Films set in the 1640s
Films set in the 1650s
Films set in Ukraine
Films set in Poland
Films based on Polish novels
History of Poland on film
Films scored by Giovanni Fusco
1960s multilingual films
Italian multilingual films
French multilingual films
1960s Italian films
1960s French films